Yang Hongqiong is a Chinese paralympic cross country skier.

Career
She participated at the 2022 Winter Paralympics and won the gold medal in the 15 kilometre sitting event with a time of 43:06.7, and 1.5 kilometre sitting event.

She was the flagbearer for China during the closing ceremony of the 2022 Winter Paralympics.

References 

Living people
Place of birth missing (living people)
Year of birth missing (living people)
Cross-country skiers at the 2022 Winter Paralympics
Medalists at the 2022 Winter Paralympics
Paralympic gold medalists for China
Paralympic medalists in cross-country skiing